Geleb Subregion is a subregion in the northwestern Anseba region (Zoba Anseba) of Eritrea. Its capital lies at Geleb.

References

Subregions of Eritrea

Anseba Region
Subregions of Eritrea